The Chamarajanagar railway station is situated on the Mysore–Chamarajanagar branch line. The station is located in Chamarajanagara district, Karnataka state, India. It serves Chamarajanagara town.

History 
The project cost . The gauge conversion work of the  stretch was completed.
There are six trains running forward and backward in this route. Five of them are slow moving passenger trains.

Trains

Trains to/from Chamarajanagar Railway Station are as follows:

Express
 16219/16220 – Chamarajanagara <-> Tirupati

Passenger
 56201/56202 – Chamarajanagara <-> Mysuru
 56203/56204 – Chamarajanagara <-> Mysuru
 56207/56208 – Chamarajanagara <-> Mysuru
 56209/56210 – Chamarajanagara <-> Mysuru
 56281/56282 – Chamarajanagara <-> Bengaluru

References

External links

Railway stations in Chamarajanagar district
Mysore railway division
Railway terminus in India